HackMiami is a formal organization of information security professionals who host the annual international hacker conference that takes place in Miami Beach, FL known as the 'HackMiami Conference.'

The organization has been involved in research primarily in the fields of malware analysis, botnets, web application security research, cybercrime research, and network security research.

The organization also organizes bi-weekly local events themed around ethical hacking topics throughout South Florida, and offer information security consultation services to both individuals and businesses.

History 

HackMiami gatherings informally began in 2008 and the organization officially incorporated in 2009. The original concept was a now retired goal of opening a physical hackerspace located in Miami, Florida.

HackMiami began as a group of computer science and engineering students having biweekly meetings held at Florida International University. The group initially focused on hardware research and development, as well as renewable energy projects. The group eventually stopped meeting at the university in order to maintain the quality and control of their research.

In early 2009, the group began to focus on web application security and malware analysis. In 2011, the organization pivoted to the a different business model of security consultation services and niche event planning in lieu of managing a membership based hackerspace.

In the year 2021, at DEFCON 29 Conference in Las Vegas, Jonathan Respeto and Chad Seaman, representing HackMiami, won the DEFCON Black Badge by placing first in the DEFCON Capture The Packet competition.

In the year 2022, at DEFCON 30 Conference in Las Vegas, Rod Soto and Jonathan Respeto with a team composed of Hackmiami and Pacific Hackers members won Red Alert ICS CTF.

Annual Conference 

HackMiami holds an annual conference called the HackMiami Conference in South Florida.

The first 2013 HackMiami Conference took place over May 17–19, 2013 in Miami Beach, Florida. The event was the subject of the Rolling Stone article "The Geeks on the Front Lines." written by journalist David Kushner, which discussed the topic of government recruitment of hackers for digital warfare.

The Winter Hacker Festival presented by HackMiami took place December 7, 2013 in Miami Beach, FL. The event featured an all day edition of the K&&K CTF hacking tournament and featured performances from YTCracker, Lil Wyte, Project Pat, Dual Core, and DJ Percent 27.

The 2014 HackMiami Conference took place May 9–11, 2014 in Miami Beach, FL and featured presentations from RSA Threat Labs, Team Cymru, Dave Marcus of Intel Security, and HackMiami Board Alexander Heid, James Ball, Rod Soto and Christopher Snyder.

The 2015 HackMiami Conference took place May 15–17, 2015 in Miami Beach, FL and featured presentations from Dave Monnier of Team Cymru and John McAfee and HackMiami Board Alexander Heid, James Ball, Rod Soto and Christopher Snyder.

During the 2015 HackMiami Conference, ethical hacker Seth Wahle demonstrated an Android malware deployment method whereby he was able to infect mobile devices through a near field communication microchip implant that had been injected into his hand.

The 2016 HackMiami Conference took place May 13–15, 2016 at the historic Hotel Deauville in Miami Beach, FL and featured presentations from Iftach Ian Amit and John McAfee and HackMiami Board Alexander Heid, James Ball, Rod Soto and Christopher Snyder.

The 2017 HackMiami Conference took place May 19–21, 2017 at the Hotel Deauville in Miami Beach, FL and featured keynote presentations from Michael Gough , Neil "Grifter" Wyler, and HackMiami Board Alexander Heid, James Ball, Rod Soto and Christopher Snyder.

In July 2017, the Hotel Deauville was damaged by an electrical fire  and has since been condemned for demolition. The closure of the hotel forced HackMiami Conference to seek another venue for subsequent years.

The 2018 HackMiami Conference took place May 18–20, 2018 at the Seacoast Suites Miami Beach in Miami Beach, FL and featured keynote presentations from Christopher Ahlberg of Recorded Future, Jack Daniel of Security BSides, and HackMiami Board Alexander Heid, James Ball, and Rod Soto.

The 2019 HackMiami Conference took place May 17–19, 2019 at the Seacoast Suites Miami Beach in Miami Beach, FL and featured keynote presentations from Dave Marcus, Vinny Troia, and HackMiami Board Alexander Heid, James Ball, and Rod Soto.

Due to the COVID pandemic and macroeconomic issues of 2020-2022, no annual conference was held and the bi-weekly local meetups migrated to a hybrid format of online and on-site.

The 2023 HackMiami Conference is scheduled to take place May 19-20, 2023 in Sunny Isles Beach, FL.

Public Gatherings

HackMiami holds public biweekly meetings where matters of information security and the progress of ongoing projects is openly discussed. Members are encouraged to present any new information or research to the group and there is active participation and collaboration between all attendees. The attendees of the local meetings and conference maintain communication throughout the year via private Slack and Discord servers.

Founders

Current Founders that make up the board of directors for the HackMiami organization:

Alexander Heid - Co-founder

James Ball - Co-founder

Rod Soto - Co-founder

References

Hackerspaces
Technology conferences
Hacker culture
Hacker conventions
Recurring events established in 2013
Organizations based in Miami